Winx or WINX may refer to:

 Winx (horse), an Australian racehorse
 Winx Club, an Italian-American animated series
 World of Winx, a spin-off to Winx Club
 Fate: The Winx Saga, a live-action series inspired by Winx Club
 WINX-FM, a radio station from Maryland
 Winx, an alias of Josh Wink
 WINX, former call sign for WLXE, (1600kHz–Rockville, Maryland)

See also
 Wink (disambiguation)
 WNKS, FM station in Charlotte, North Carolina, US
 WNKX (disambiguation), FM and TV stations in Centerville, Tennessee, US

Show winx club